Subodh Mukherjee (14 April 1921 – 21 May 2005) was an Indian filmmaker (producer and director) of Hindi-language films. He was the brother of the leading producer-director Sashadhar Mukherjee.

Profile
Mukherjee was a devotee of the school of movie-making that believed that films were all about great storytelling. In the first two decades of his career, he had a high success percentage, but like so many movie-makers of his generation, he floundered from the seventies and quit in 1985.

Filmography

References

External links
 (note alternate spelling)
Varietydeath notice 

1921 births
2005 deaths
Deaths from leukemia
Film directors from Uttar Pradesh
People from Jhansi
Deaths from cancer in India
Hindi-language film directors
20th-century Indian film directors